Jiang Ziya ( century BC –  century BC), also known by several other names, was a Chinese noble who helped kings Wen and Wu of Zhou overthrow the Shang in ancient China. Following their victory at Muye, he continued to serve as a Zhou minister. He remained loyal to the regent Duke of Zhou during the Rebellion of the Three Guards; following the Duke's punitive raids against the restive Eastern Barbarians or Dongyi, Jiang was enfeoffed with their territory as the marchland of Qi. He established his seat at Yingqiu (in modern Linzi).

Names
The first marquis of Qi bore the given name Shang. The nobility of ancient China bore two surnames, an ancestral name and a clan name. His were Jiang (姜) and Lü (呂), respectively. He had two courtesy names, Shangfu (尚父; lit. "Esteemed Father") and Ziya (lit. "Master Ivory, Master Tusk"), which were used for respectful address by his peers. The names Jiang Shang and Jiang Ziya became the most common after their use in the popular Ming-era novel Fengshen Bang, written over 2,500 years after his death.

Following the elevation of Qi to a duchy, he was given the posthumous name 齊太公 , on occasions left untranslated as "Duke Tai". It is under this name that he appears in Sima Qian's Records of the Grand Historian. He is also less often known as "Grand Duke Jiang" (姜太公; Jiang Taigong), the "Grand Duke's Hope" (Taigong Wang; 太公望), and the "Hoped-for Lü" (Lü Wang; 呂望). as Jiang Ziya was seen as the sage – whom King Wen of Zhou's ancestor Duke Uncle Ancestor Lei (公叔祖类) (also titled 太公 "Great ~ Grand Duke") had prophesied about and hoped for – to help the Zhou prosper.

Background
The last ruler of the Shang dynasty, King Zhou of Shang, was a tyrant who spent his days with his favorite concubine Daji and executing or punishing officials. After faithfully serving the Shang court for approximately twenty years, Jiang came to find King Zhou insufferable, and feigned madness in order to escape court life and the ruler's power. Jiang was an expert in military affairs and hoped that someday someone would call on him to help overthrow the king. Jiang disappeared, only to resurface in the Zhou countryside at the apocryphal age of seventy-two, when he was recruited by King Wen of Zhou and became instrumental in Zhou affairs.  It is said that, while in exile, he continued to wait placidly, fishing in a tributary of the Wei River (near today's Xi'an) using a barbless hook or even no hook at all, on the theory that the fish would come to him of their own volition when they were ready.

Hired by King Wen of the Zhou

King Wen of Zhou, (central Shaanxi), found Jiang Ziya fishing. King Wen, following the advice of his father and grandfather before him, was in search of talented people. In fact, he had been told by his grandfather, the Grand Duke of Zhou, that one day a sage would appear to help rule the Zhou state.

The first meeting between King Wen and Jiang Ziya is recorded in the book that records Jiang's teachings to King Wen and King Wu, the Six Secret Teachings (太公六韜).  The meeting was recorded as being characterized by a mythic aura common to meetings between great historical figures in ancient China. Before going hunting, King Wen consulted his chief scribe to perform divination in order to discover if the king would be successful. The divinations revealed that, "'While hunting on the north bank of the Wei river you will get a great catch. It will not be any form of dragon, nor a tiger or great bear. According to the signs, you will find a duke or marquis there whom Heaven has sent to be your teacher.  If employed as your assistant, you will flourish and the benefits will extend to three generations of Zhou Kings.'"  Recognizing that the result of this divination was similar to the result of divinations given to his eldest ancestor, King Wen observed a vegetarian diet for three days in order to spiritually purify himself for the meeting.  While on the hunt, King Wen encountered Jiang fishing on a grass mat, and courteously began a conversation with him concerning military tactics and statecraft.  The subsequent conversation between Jiang Ziya and King Wen forms the basis of the text in the Six Secret Teachings.

When King Wen met Jiang Ziya, at first sight he felt that this was an unusual old man, and began to converse with him. He discovered that this white-haired fisherman was actually an astute political thinker and military strategist. This, he felt, must be the man his grandfather was waiting for. He took Jiang Ziya in his coach to the court and appointed him prime minister and gave him the title Jiang Taigong Wang ("The Great Duke's Hope", or "The expected of the Great Duke") in reference to a prophetic dream Danfu, grandfather of Wenwang, had had many years before. This was later shortened to Jiang Taigong. King Wu married Jiang Ziya's daughter Yi Jiang, who bore him several sons.

Attack of the Shang
After King Wen died, his son King Wu, who inherited the throne, decided to send troops to overthrow the King of Shang. But Jiang Taigong stopped him, saying: "While I was fishing at Panxi, I realised one truth – if you want to succeed you need to be patient. We must wait for the appropriate opportunity to eliminate the King of Shang". Soon it was reported that the people of Shang were so oppressed that no one dared speak. King Wu and Jiang Taigong decided this was the time to attack, for the people had lost faith in the ruler. The bloody Battle of Muye then ensued some 35 kilometres from the Shang capital Yin (modern day Anyang, Henan Province).

Jiang Taigong charged at the head of the troops, beat the battle drums and then with 100 of his men drew the Shang troops to the southwest. King Wu's troops moved quickly and surrounded the capital. The Shang King had sent relatively untrained slaves to fight. This, plus the fact that many surrendered or revolted, enabled Zhou to take the capital.

King Zhou set fire to his palace and perished in it, and King Wu and his successors as the Zhou dynasty established rule over all of China. As for Daji, one version has it that she was captured and executed by the order of Jiang Taigong himself, another that she took her own life, another that she was killed by King Zhou. Jiang Taigong was made duke of the State of Qi (today's Shandong province), which thrived with better communications and exploitation of its fish and salt resources under him.

As the most notable prime minister employed by King Wen and King Wu, he was declared "the master of strategy"—resulting in the Zhou government growing far stronger than that of the Shang dynasty as the years elapsed.

Personal views and historical influence
An account of Jiang Ziya's life written long after his time says he held that a country could become powerful only when the people prospered. If the officials enriched themselves while the people remained poor, the ruler would not last long. The major principle in ruling a country should be to love the people; and to love the people meant to reduce taxes and corvée labour. By following these ideas, King Wen is said to have made the Zhou state prosper very rapidly.

His treatise on military strategy, Six Secret Strategic Teachings, is considered one of the Seven Military Classics of Ancient China.

In the Tang dynasty he was accorded his own state temple as the martial patron and thereby attained officially sanctioned status approaching that of Confucius.

Family
Wives:
 Lady, of the Ma lineage
 Shen Jiang, of the Jiang clan of Shen

Sons:
 First son, Prince Ji (1050–975 BC), ruled as Duke Ding of Qi from 1025 to 975 BC
 Prince Ding
 Prince Ren
 Prince Nian
 Prince Qi
 Prince Fang
 Prince Shao
 Prince Luo
 Prince Ming
 Prince Qing
 Prince Yi
 Prince Shang
 Prince Qi
 Prince Zuo

Daughters:
 First daughter, Yi Jiang
 Married King Wu of Zhou (d. 1043 BC), and had issue (King Cheng of Zhou, Shu Yu of Tang)

His descendants acquired his personal name Shang as their surname.

In Taoism

In Chinese and Taoist belief, Jiang Ziya is sometimes considered to have been a Taoist adept. In one legend, he used the knowledge he gained at Kunlun to defeat the Shang's supernatural protectors Qianliyan and Shunfeng'er, by using magic and invocations. He is also a prominent character in the Ming-era Romance of the Investiture of the Gods, in which he is Daji's archrival and is personally responsible for her execution.
 
There are two xiehouyu about him:
Grand Duke Jiang fishes – those who are willing jump at the bait, which means "put one's own head in the noose".
Grand Duke Jiang investiture of the gods – omitting himself, which means "leave out oneself".

Liexian Zhuan, a book on Taoist immortals, contains his short legendary biography:

In popular culture

Manga
 The protagonist of Hoshin Engi, Taikoubou (Tai Gong Wang), is based on Jiang Ziya. However, his personality is quite comical.

Video games
 In the scenario "Chinese Unification" of the Civilization IV: Warlords expansion pack, Jiang Ziya is the leader of the State of Qi.
 He is also playable in video games Aizouban Houshin Engi, Hoshin Engi 2 and Mystic Heroes.
 Jiang Ziya is a playable character in Koei's Warriors Orochi 2. In the game, he is alternatively referred to as Taigong Wang. A stark contrast to the historical accounts however, would be that he is portrayed as a handsome young man, who is quite arrogant, although he is still a divinely gifted strategist and a good man at heart. He is often referred to by others, namely Fu Xi, Nüwa and Daji as "boy". The reason for his radically improvised design may be to emphasize his rivalry with Daji, whose character design depicts her as being young and beautiful as well. Their clashes are loosely inspired by the Fengshen Yanyi.
 In Final Fantasy XI, the item "Lu Shang's Fishing Rod" is awarded to players for catching 10,000 carp. It is noteworthy for its ability to catch both small and large fish, and is notoriously hard to break.
 In the online game War of Legends, Jiang Ziya is a playable monk, with 45 "ability".
 In the popular game Eiyuu Senki, Tai Gong Wang is one female amongst the ancient heroes player will encounter in the game.
 In Dragalia Lost, Jiang Ziya is the name of an obtainable female Qilin adventurer.
 In December 2021, Fate/Grand Order revealed Taikoubou (one of Jiang Ziya's aliases) as a new obtainable servant in the game.

Food 

 In Vietnamese cuisine, the grilled fish dish Chả cá Lã Vọng is named after Jiang, specifically after his title "Lü Wang" (Lã Vọng in Vietnamese).

Films
 Jiang Ziya – 2020 Chinese 3D computer-animated fantasy adventure film directed by Cheng Teng and Li Wei. The plot is loosely based on the classic novel Investiture of the Gods, attributed to Xu Zhonglin.

Literature
 In The Poppy War trilogy by R. F. Kuang, Jiang Ziya is the name of a loremaster at the Sinegard Academy, and the protagonist's primary mentor figure.

See also
 Boyi and Shuqi
 Zhou Wang (Shang dynasty)
 King Wu of Zhou (Zhou dynasty)
 Chinese mythology
 Six Secret Teachings

Notes

External links

 Jiang Taigong: The Supreme Strategist
 Welcome to Taoistsecret.com

11th-century BC Chinese monarchs
Zhou dynasty generals
Monarchs of Qi (state)
Military strategists
Deified Chinese people
Investiture of the Gods characters
Ancient Chinese military writers
Founding monarchs